Hallett Cove railway station is located on the Seaford line. Situated in the southern Adelaide suburb of Hallett Cove , it is 21.4 kilometres from Adelaide station.

History
A station opened in 1915 as Hallett's Cove as part of the former Willunga line. It was closed to freight in 1962, and was renamed Hallett Cove in 1965. In the early years of the line, it had a stone-loading plant, traces of which may still be seen. That station was about a kilometre east of the present Hallett Cove station.

In 1959, a branch was approved to make Hallett Cove a junction with a branch from near the station to the Port Stanvac Refinery, which was opened on 14 May 1963. The Willunga line was cut back to Hallett Cove in 1971, and the Port Stanvac branch became the main line of the Christie Downs (later Noarlunga Centre, now Seaford) line in 1974. Once it became the main line, there was a siding on the western side of Lonsdale for the refinery, and a siding on the eastern side for the Chrysler (later Mitsubishi) engine factory which opened in 1967 and closed in 1983. Both of these sidings were closed by the 1990s. More recently, the station was closed on 18 January 2010 for an eight-month rebuild which included building a canopy over the station.

Services by platform

References

External links

Flickr gallery

Railway stations in Adelaide
Railway stations in Australia opened in 1915